Ehrhardt is a German surname. Notable people with the surname include:

 Annelie Ehrhardt (born 1950), German athlete
 Arthur Ehrhardt (1896–1971), German Waffen-SS officer and leading figure in the post-war neo-Nazi movement
 Clyde Ehrhardt (1921–1963), American football offensive lineman
 Johann Heinrich Ehrhardt (1805-1883), German locomotive manufacturer and inventor
 Heinrich Ehrhardt (1840-1928), German industrialist, nephew of Johann Heinrich
 Helmuth Ehrhardt, German psychiatrist
 Hermann Ehrhardt (1881–1971), German Freikorps commander
 Karl Ehrhardt (1924–2008), iconic New York Mets' fans
 Paul Ehrhardt (1888-1981), German painter
 Rube Ehrhardt (1894–1980), American baseball pitcher

See also
 Heinz Erhardt (1909–1979), German entertainer
 Herbert Erhardt (1930–2010), German football (soccer) player

German-language surnames
Surnames from given names